{{DISPLAYTITLE:Nu2 Canis Majoris b}}

Nu2 Canis Majoris b, (7 CMa b) is a water cloud jovian extrasolar planet orbiting the star Nu2 Canis Majoris, approximately 64.71 light years away in the constellation of Canis Major. It was discovered in 2011 by Wittenmyer, R. by radial velocity.

External links

References
 

Canis Major
Giant planets
Exoplanets discovered in 2011
Exoplanets detected by radial velocity